Thomas Hamilton House may refer to:

Thomas Hamilton House (San Diego, California), a San Diego historic landmark
Thomas Hamilton House (Calais, Maine), listed on the NRHP in Washington County, Maine

See also
Hamilton House (disambiguation)